Authors are still producing original books in Latin today. This page lists contemporary or recent books (from the 21st, 20th and 19th centuries) originally written in Latin. We do not call these books "new" because the term Neo-Latin or New Latin refers to books written as early as the 1500s, which is "newer" than Classical Antiquity or the Middle Ages.

Translations of pre-existing modern literature are not included here.

Fiction

Literary fiction

Fiction for educational use

Novellas for Latin learners

Plays for educational use

Poetry

Non-Fiction

See also
Libri Latine redditi in Vicipaedia Latina (Wikipedia in Latin)
List of Latin translations of modern literature
List of modern literature translated into dead languages

References

External links
 
 
 
 

Latin language
Latin-language literature